Cardboard is a generic term for a heavy-duty paper.

Cardboard may also refer to:

Materials
 Binder's board
 Card stock, heavy paper used for making cards
 Corrugated fiberboard, a combination of paperboards, usually two flat liners and one inner fluted corrugated medium, often used for making corrugated boxes
 Display board, Poster board
 Paperboard, a paper-based material often used for folding cartons, set-up boxes, carded packaging, etc.
 Containerboard
 Folding boxboard
 Solid bleached board
 Solid unbleached board
 White lined chipboard

Other uses
 Google Cardboard, a smartphone mount supporting virtual reality visualization
 The Cardboards, a Pittsburgh, Pennsylvania band of the 1970s and 1980s
 Cardboard record, a type of cheaply made phonograph record made of plastic-coated thin paperboard
 Cardboard, a graphic novel by Doug TenNapel
 Pycnanthus angolensis, a tree species

See also
 Cardboard box